Codeseven was formed in 1995 as a melodic hardcore band in Winston-Salem, North Carolina. Their first "official" release (their actual first release was called Paper or Plastic [1996], released through a small Winston-Salem-based label called Huel Records), A Sense of Coalition (1998) gained popularity on college radio stations for a cover of Don Henley's "The Boys of Summer" (not to be confused with The Ataris' cover of the same song that became a mainstream radio hit years later).

With the milestone release, Division of Labor (1999), Codeseven found themselves at the forefront of the hardcore movement. With the departure of singer David Owen, they released The Rescue (2002). This album saw the band becoming less aggressive and more melodic, largely abandoning their hardcore roots in favor of progressive, experimental space rock as Cave In had done. Their final album, Dancing Echoes/Dead Sounds, was released in 2004 on Equal Vision Records. The following year the band broke up in order to pursue different opportunities.

It was announced on July 1, 2010, that Codeseven would be playing a reunion show on August 20, 2010, at Greene Street Club in Greensboro, NC.  Following an overwhelmingly positive response, it was decided that they would continue to tour.  On August 2, 2010, it was announced the band would support Circa Survive alongside Dredg and Animals as Leaders on a tour starting October 15, 2010.

The set at their reunion show on August 20, 2010, featured songs from all four of their most recent albums including 6 songs with original 2nd vocalist Dave Owen.  Many of these songs had not been played in close to 10 years.  The set closed with their cover of Don Henley's "The Boys of Summer."

Discography 
Paper or Plastic (Huel Records, 1996)
A Sense of Coalition (The Music Cartel, 1998)
Division of Labor (1999)
The Rescue (The Music Cartel, 2002)
Dancing Echoes/Dead Sounds (Equal Vision Records, 2004)

Related bands 
Adair – Matt Tuttle
Telescreen – James Tuttle, Jon Tuttle, Matt Tuttle, Eric Weyer
Sundrone – Jeff Jenkins
Red Orchestra Radio – James Tuttle
18 Wheels of Pain – Dave Owen
Echo Crush – James Tuttle
Small Planes – Matt Tuttle

References

External links 
Codeseven on Myspace
Codeseven on MusicIsMyDrug.com

Alternative rock groups from North Carolina
Musical groups established in 1995
Musical groups disestablished in 2005
American space rock musical groups
Equal Vision Records artists
Hardcore punk groups from North Carolina
American experimental rock groups